Knud Enemark Jensen (30 November 1936 – 26 August 1960) was a Danish cyclist who died while participating in the 1960 Summer Olympics in Rome, Italy. During his career, he was involved in an early doping scandal.

Biography

Jensen was born in Aarhus. In 1960 he was the winner of the individual Nordic Championship, as well as a member of the Danish team that won the silver medal in the team time trial at that event.

The Olympic 100 km team time trial road race was held in 40 degrees Celsius/104 degrees Fahrenheit heat on Viale Cristoforo Colombo in Rome. One of the four-man Danish team, Jorgen B. Jorgensen, dropped out of the race due to sunstroke after the first lap, necessitating that all three remaining Danish cyclists finish the race for the team not to be disqualified. Jensen told his teammates that he felt dizzy. Niels Baunsøe clutched his jersey, keeping him from falling, while Vagn Bangsborg held Jensen from the other side.  Bangsborg sprayed Jensen with water, leading to an apparent improvement, but when Baunsøe let go, Jensen collapsed and fractured his skull on the pavement.

Jensen was brought by ambulance to a military tent near the finish line, with temperatures inside the tent reaching approximately 50 degrees Celsius/122 degrees Fahrenheit, where he died that afternoon without regaining consciousness. Prince Axel of Denmark, an International Olympic Committee member, was on his way to Jensen's bedside when Jensen died.

Oluf Jorgensen, the Danish cycling team's trainer, told Danish government investigators that he had given Jensen and some other cyclists Roniacol (nicotinyl alcohol), a vasodilator. Jensen's autopsy was conducted at the Istituto di Medicina Legale. On 25 March 1961, the three Italian physicians who performed the autopsy submitted a final report stating that Jensen's death was caused by heatstroke, and that no drugs were found in his body. The complete autopsy report was never made public. Years later, Alvaro Marchiori, one of the doctors who conducted the autopsy, claimed that they had "found traces of several things", including amphetamine.

Jensen's death led the International Olympic Committee to form a medical committee in 1961 and institute drug testing at the 1968 Winter Olympics in Grenoble, France, and at the 1968 Summer Olympics in Mexico City, Mexico.

Jensen was married to the niece of former Olympic cycling champion Henry Hansen. His family received one million lire ($1600) from an Olympic insurance policy in compensation for his death.

See also 

 List of racing cyclists and pacemakers with a cycling-related death
 List of doping cases in cycling
 List of sportspeople sanctioned for doping offences
 Denmark at the 1960 Summer Olympics
 Olympic and Paralympic deaths

References

External links 
 Olympics timeline
 

1936 births
1960 deaths
Cyclists at the 1960 Summer Olympics
Cyclists who died while racing
Danish male cyclists
Doping in sport
Olympic cyclists of Denmark
Olympic deaths
Sport deaths in Italy
Sportspeople from Aarhus